Alexandru Cosma (born 21 February 1926) was a Romanian weightlifter. He competed in the men's bantamweight event at the 1952 Summer Olympics.

References

External links
 

1926 births
Possibly living people
Romanian male weightlifters
Olympic weightlifters of Romania
Weightlifters at the 1952 Summer Olympics
Sportspeople from Bucharest
20th-century Romanian people
21st-century Romanian people